Bandy World Championship Y-19 is a Youth Bandy World Championship up to the age of 19 years. Usually, only the core bandy playing nations are taking part.

History
The first Bandy World Championship Y-19 was held in 1968 and it has been held every two years since then. In 1994 and 1996 it was Y20 teams instead.

The designation is sometimes given as U-19 instead of Y-19, but the meaning is the same. Only players under the age of 19 take part. 

In 2014, the World Championship Y19 was played in Oslo. Russia beat Finland in the final and Sweden won the bronze medals.

Results

Medal table

References

Youth 19
Under-19 sport
Recurring sporting events established in 1968